Mai Chao-cheng (1941/1942 – 6 March 2019) was a Taiwanese economist. He was a distinguished professor of Tamkang University and served as an advisor to President Chen Shui-bian. He was elected an academician of Academia Sinica in 1994.

Biography 
Mai studied at National Taiwan University, where he earned his BA in 1966 and his MA in 1970. He continued his studies in the United States, earning another MA from the University of Rochester in 1973 and his Ph.D. in economics from Texas A&M University in 1976.

After returning to Taiwan, he taught at National Chengchi University from 1976–80, and was a joint appointment professor at National Taiwan University from 1979 to 1999. He was a visiting scholar at Harvard–Yenching Institute from 1981-82. Mai served as Director of Sun Yat-sen Institute for Social Sciences of Academia Sinica from 1987–93, and as President of Chung-Hua Institution for Economic Research from 1996 to 2002. He was also Distinguished Chair Professor in the Department of Industrial Economics of Tamkang University. He was elected an academician of Academia Sinica in 1994.

During the 1997 Asian financial crisis, Mai analyzed the financial situation of Taiwan and proposed policy measures to minimize economic impact of the crisis. In 2000, he was appointed a policy advisor to Chen Shui-bian, President of the Republic of China.

Mai died on 6 March 2019, aged 77.

References

1940s births
2019 deaths
20th-century Taiwanese economists
National Taiwan University alumni
University of Rochester alumni
Texas A&M University alumni
Academic staff of the National Chengchi University
Academic staff of the National Taiwan University
Academic staff of Tamkang University
Members of Academia Sinica
Taiwanese expatriates in the United States
Senior Advisors to President Chen Shui-bian
21st-century Taiwanese economists
Taiwanese male writers
Male non-fiction writers